Perth: The Geylang Massacre is a 2004 Singaporean drama film written and directed by Djinn (the pseudonym of Ong Lay Jinn).  It stars Lim Kay Tong as Harry Lee, a part-time security guard and taxicab driver in Singapore.  He is a self-described "simple man" whose life becomes complicated when he finds work as a driver for an escort service.  Its title refers to the Australian city, which is where he dreams of retiring and considers a paradise.

Reception
Todd Konrad of the ''Independent Film Quarterly':

Brian Holcomb of 'Pop Matters' :

Cast
Lim Kay Tong as Harry Lee
A. Panneeirchelvam as Selvam
Sunny Pang as Angry Boy Lee
Ivy Cheng as Mai

References

External links 
 
 PopMatters review

2004 films
2004 drama films
Perth, Western Australia
Singaporean drama films